is a Japanese football player. She plays for Sanfrecce Hiroshima in the WE League. She played for Japan national team.

Club career
Ueno was born in Kumamoto Prefecture on September 27, 1996. After graduating from high school, she joined Ehime FC in 2015.

National team career
Ueno was a member of Japan U-20 national team for 2016 U-20 World Cup and Japan won 3rd place. She scored 5 goals and 2 assists, and get Golden Shoe awards. On April 9, 2017, she debuted for Japan national team against Costa Rica. She played 6 games for Japan.

National team statistics

International goals

References

External links

Japan Football Association
Ehime FC

1996 births
Living people
Association football people from Kumamoto Prefecture
Japanese women's footballers
Japan women's international footballers
Nadeshiko League players
Ehime FC Ladies players
Women's association football forwards
Sanfrecce Hiroshima Regina players